The iHeartRadio Jingle Ball Tour 2014 was a national holiday tour by iHeartMedia that began on December 5, 2014, in Los Angeles at the Staples Center hosted by Ryan Seacrest and special guest host Nick Jonas. The tour celebrates the holiday season and captures the holiday spirit of the iHeartRadio app, with performances by some of the year's biggest recording artists. The tour ended on December 22, 2014, in Tampa at the Amalie Arena (formerly known as Tampa Bay Times Forum). It is the highest grossing Jingle Ball Tour of all time.

Z100's Jingle Ball in New York was streamed on Yahoo Live for fans nationwide and broadcast live on iHeartMedia Contemporary Hit Radio (CHR) stations across the country on Friday, December 12, 2014. The event also aired nationwide as a two-hour special on The CW Network on Thursday, December 18, 2014.

Performers
Iggy Azalea
Jason Derulo
Fall Out Boy
Becky G
Ariana Grande
Calvin Harris
Jessie J
Nicki Minaj
Jeremih
Nick Jonas
Kiesza
Mary Lambert
Lil Jon
Demi Lovato
Magic!
Maroon 5
Shawn Mendes
Jake Miller
Nico & Vinz
OneRepublic
Rita Ora
Rixton
Sam Smith
Taylor Swift
T.I.
Meghan Trainor
Pharrell
Charli XCX
5 Seconds of Summer

Shows

References

IHeartRadio digital channels
2014 concert tours
Concert tours of the United States